Homecoming is a scripted psychological thriller podcast produced by Gimlet Media and starring Catherine Keener, Oscar Isaac, and David Schwimmer.

Background 
The podcast debuted on November 9, 2016, and was the first scripted fiction podcast produced by Gimlet Media. The cast includes Catherine Keener as Heidi Bergman, Oscar Isaac as Walter Cruz, and David Schwimmer as Colin Belfast. The sound design was done by Mark Phillips. The story was written by Micah Bloomberg and Eli Horowitz. The story is set in Florida and follows a case worker and a veteran involved in a government program called the homecomeing initiative. The second season of the podcast debuted on July 19, 2017.

Adaptation 
The podcast was adapted into a television series, starring Stephan James and Julia Roberts. It was released on Amazon Prime on November 2, 2018.

References

External links 
 

Audio podcasts
2016 podcast debuts
2017 podcast endings
Horror podcasts
Scripted podcasts
Gimlet Media
Podcasts adapted into television shows
Thriller podcasts